Prasadampadu is a part of Vijayawada in Krishna district of the Indian state of Andhra Pradesh. It is located in Vijayawada (rural) mandal of Vijayawada revenue division. As per the G.O. No. M.S.104 (dated:23-03-2017), Municipal Administration and Urban Development Department, it became a part of Vijayawada metropolitan area.

See also 
List of census towns in Andhra Pradesh

References 

Neighbourhoods in Vijayawada